Tanto Campbell is a Paralympian athlete from Jamaica competing mainly in category F56 discus events.

Campbell is a two time Paralympic bronze medalist having won the bronze medal in discus in 2004 in the F56 class and in 2008 in the F55/56 class. In 2004 he also competed in the F55/56 class javelin. In 2012 Summer Paralympics, he placed 5th in the F54-56 class discus throw.

At the 2015 Parapan American Games in Toronto, Campbell won gold in javelin throw F56 and silver in discus throw F53/54/55 competition.

References

External links
 

1986 births
Living people
Paralympic athletes of Jamaica
Athletes (track and field) at the 2004 Summer Paralympics
Athletes (track and field) at the 2008 Summer Paralympics
Paralympic bronze medalists for Jamaica
Medalists at the 2004 Summer Paralympics
Medalists at the 2008 Summer Paralympics
Jamaican male discus throwers
Jamaican male javelin throwers
Commonwealth Games medallists in athletics
Commonwealth Games gold medallists for Jamaica
Athletes (track and field) at the 2006 Commonwealth Games
Paralympic medalists in athletics (track and field)
Medalists at the 2007 Parapan American Games
Medalists at the 2011 Parapan American Games
Medalists at the 2015 Parapan American Games
20th-century Jamaican people
21st-century Jamaican people
Medallists at the 2006 Commonwealth Games